Trena Trice-Hill (born August 4, 1965) is an American former professional basketball player for the New York Liberty and current assistant coach at Columbia University.

College
Trice played basketball at NC State from 1983 to 1987, where she averaged 15.1 ppg and 8.4 rbg. She helped lead the Wolfpack to Atlantic Coast Conference (ACC) Tournament titles in 1985 and 1987 and an ACC regular season title in 1985. She retired sixth all-time in scoring (1,761), fourth all-time in rebounding (984), and second in blocks (184). She holds the record for the highest field goal percentage for a career (58.5%).

NC State statistics
Source

Personal life
Hill graduate with a degree in SpeechCommunications from NC State. She has a daughter.

References

External links
Trena Trice WNBA Stats | Basketball-Reference.com
WNBA.com: New York Liberty Draft History
Trena Trice-Hill Bio – GoColumbiaLions.com – Official Web Site of Columbia University Athletics

1965 births
Living people
African-American basketball players
American women's basketball coaches
Centers (basketball)
NC State Wolfpack women's basketball coaches
NC State Wolfpack women's basketball players
New York Liberty draft picks
New York Liberty players
Power forwards (basketball)
Basketball players from Norfolk, Virginia
Sportspeople from Norfolk, Virginia
VCU Rams women's basketball coaches